Toolmaking (sometimes styled as tool-making or tool making) may refer to:
 Tool making
 Tool#History
 Tool use by animals
 Tool and die maker